Christian mission to Jews, evangelism among Jews, or proselytism to Jews, is a subset of Christian missionary activities which are engaged in for the specific purpose of converting Jews to Christianity.

History

Early Christianity

The Gospels record that Jesus focused on preaching and teaching among the Jews in Judea and Galilee. Although he briefly visited Samaria to speak with Samaritans (John 4), he largely avoided ministering to Gentiles. In one encounter with a Gentile woman (Mt 15:23), he said, "I was sent only to the lost sheep of the house of Israel." Matthew and Acts record Jesus commissioning his followers to take his message beyond the confines of Judea after his resurrection (Mt 29:18-20; Acts 1:8). Although Christianity spread rapidly in Gentile regions as a result of this commissioning, Jesus's early Jewish followers did not neglect spreading his message among fellow Jews in Judea and the diaspora.

The first recorded sermon by one of Jesus's apostles is by Peter, speaking to fellow Jews in Jerusalem (Acts 2:14-36). The themes of Peter's message (see kerygma) included the death and resurrection of Jesus, the fulfillment of biblical prophecy, and the need for his Jewish audience to repent, be baptized, and believe in Jesus for the forgiveness of sins. Thus, Peter's sermon is an example of Christian missions to Jewish people at the inception of the movement.

Acts states that three thousand Jews joined the Jesus movement as a result of Peter's preaching (Acts 2:41). This number expanded to five thousand Jewish men shortly thereafter (Acts 4:4). Eventually, James the brother of Jesus became the leader of the Jerusalem congregation (Acts 21:17), which continued to grow through the preaching of the apostles. Around 57 CE, Acts reports that the Jerusalem congregation included at least Jewish 20,000 members (Acts 21:20, Gk:μυριάδες, myriades), likely as a result of mission activity.

Jerusalem was familiar territory to the apostles, but soon they expanded their mission beyond Judea. It is often noted that Peter was entrusted with going on missions to Jews, and Paul of Tarsus was entrusted with going on missions to Gentiles (Gal 2:9). Indeed, Peter addressed one of his letters to the Jewish diaspora (1 Pe 1:1), and Paul emphasized Gentile missions throughout the Roman world. However, Paul continued to preach about Jesus to Jewish people throughout the diaspora (Acts 17-19). Commenting on Romans 1:16, Douglas Moo writes, "However much the church may seem to be dominated by Gentiles, Paul insists that the promises of God realized in the gospel are 'first of all' for the Jew. To Israel the promises were first given, and to the Jews they still particularly apply. Without in any way subtracting from the equal access that all people now have to the gospel, then, Paul insists that the gospel, 'promised beforehand … in the holy Scriptures' (1:2), has a special relevance to the Jew." According to Acts, Paul illustrated this continued commitment to Jewish mission by preaching in synagogues and reasoning with Jewish people about Jesus's death and resurrection (Acts 17:2-3). He conveyed his deep desire that the Jewish people would believe in Jesus (Rom 9:1-5, 10:1), and exhorted his readers to send preachers to share the message of Jesus to the Jewish people (Rom 10:15-17).

After the close of the New Testament, Christian missions to Jews continued to exist. An important second century source is the Dialogue with Trypho of Justin Martyr (c.140) which may be partially fictionalized, and "Trypho" may be a cypher for rabbi Tarfon but otherwise shows a level playing field and mutual respect as each participant appeals to the other. Many church fathers contributed treatises for the purpose of Jewish mission, as surveyed by A. Lukyn Williams.

After Constantine

From Constantine I, when Christianity became the official religion of the Roman empire, the position of Christians to Jews changed. Some laws were instituted which protected the rights of Jewish converts from disinheritance, other laws also protected from abuse of the privileges of conversion from those who converted from Judaism "only for a cancellation of debt;" which suggests that in some areas of the empire local incentives to conversion existed. Accounts of conversion itself are not mentioned in rabbinical sources and are not frequent in Christian sources - excepting Epiphanius of Salamis' account of the conversion of Count Joseph of Tiberias, and Sozomen's accounts of Jewish conversions in Constantinople.

Medieval

During the medieval period, conversions in Christian ruled lands were frequently conducted by force, such as in the case of the Alhambra Decree of 1492, leading to the conversos, those Jews who were converted by force, and the Marranos, those Jews who voluntarily converted or were converted by force but continued to practice Judaism in secret. In Muslim lands, dialogue between Jews and Christians was more equal, and Jewish apologists were able to openly refute Christians. In Christian lands, those such as Hasdai Crescas (c.1340–1411) could only write refutations of Christian beliefs at great risk to themselves.

After the Reformation
In Europe, the Reformation did not immediately give rise to increased proselytism to Jews, in part, this was due to Luther's antisemitism and Calvin's indifference.

18th and 19th centuries
 
In 1809, Joseph Frey (born Joseph Levi), founded the London Society for Promoting Christianity Amongst the Jews after disagreements developed between him and the generic London Missionary Society. Frey's organization was the first of its kind and its founding marked the dawn of a new period of missions to the Jews. Later, the London Society was renamed the London Jews' Society and later, it was renamed the Church's Ministry Among Jewish People. Its missionaries included Alexander McCaul, the author of The Old Paths, and the grammarian C. W. H. Pauli (born Zebi Nasi Hirsch Prinz). After Frey's group, which was largely led by converted Jews, the generic missionary organisations also attempted more culturally sensitive efforts and in 1841 the Church of Scotland appointed a Gentile missionary, John Duncan to the Jews of the Austro-Hungarian Empire, to be based in Budapest. At the same time "John Nicolayson" (the Dane Hans Nicolajsen), bishop Michael Solomon Alexander, and other missionaries were sent to Palestine. Responses came such as Louis Stern's Anti-Jewish Conversionist Society of Birmingham. David Ruderman has provided a survey of the London Society's work in the 19th century in his study on Alexander McCaul.

A comprehensive book about 19th century Jewish missions was written by Albert Edward Thompson in 1902. In his introduction to the work, William Blackstone wrote, "The Church is slowly awakening to a sense of her obligation and privilege as the custodian of the Jewish oracles, and the herald of the Jewish Messiah, to include this nation [Jews] in her missionary enterprises. Much has been attempted and more is being planned." Thompson provided detailed accounting of all the Jewish missions then known in the United States, the British Isles, continental Europe, Africa, Asia, and Australia, totalling 90 missions around the globe.

20th and 21st centuries

Early 20th century Jewish missions built upon the growth of the 19th century, with England, the United States, and continental Europe serving as major missions hubs. The largest English mission was the London Society, and the largest American mission was the American Board of Missions to the Jews. These two missions, among many others, were highly involved in continental Europe and Ottoman Palestine (later, the British Mandate).

In his thesis which was titled, "A Survey of Missions to the Jews in Continental Europe, 1900-1950," Mitchell Leslie Glaser divided his study into three periods:
 The period prior to World War I (1900-1914): "In the midst of widespread geographic redistribution of the Jewish people, missions to the Jews flourished until the First World War."
 The period between the wars (1918-1939): "Missions recovered from the destruction of World War I and entered a period of resurgence."
 World War II and the immediate post war period (1939-50): "Undercurrents of lessened commitment to Jewish evangelization were already surfacing before the end of the war, but missions to the Jews, particularly in Europe, were decimated along with the Jewish population. In general, missions to the Jews declined during this period because of the Holocaust and the theological shifts within the mainline sending churches and the national churches of Continental Europe."

With the decimation of European missions, and with the disappearance of Jewish populations in Europe as a result of the Holocaust, the center of post-World War II missions shifted from Europe to Britain and the United States. The American Board of Missions to the Jews (ABMJ), not attached to any denomination, survived the wider decline in Jewish missions and arose to become the largest Jewish mission in the postwar era. The ABMJ pioneered new ministry strategies which included radio broadcasts, television specials, and newspaper ad campaigns. One of the ABMJ's missionaries was Moishe Rosen, who established the San Francisco branch of the ABMJ in the early 1970's. Rosen ended his relationship with the mission because he did not like its methodology, and in 1973, he transformed the San Francisco branch of the mission into a new organization, Jews for Jesus. Jews for Jesus' focus on street evangelism and media campaigns brought it into the national spotlight, and it rapidly grew and eventually became the largest and most influential Jewish mission of the late 20th century. In 1984, the ABMJ changed its name to Chosen People Ministries.

In the 21st century, Jews for Jesus and Chosen People Ministries operate in dozens of American cities and they also operate throughout the world. Other prominent Jewish missions include the Church's Ministry Among Jewish People, Life in Messiah, Friends of Israel Gospel Ministry, the International Board of Jewish Missions, and CJF Ministries. The Lausanne Consultation on Jewish Evangelism, founded in 1980, serves as an international society for Jewish missions to network, share resources, and minister together.

Jewish responses

Initial Jewish responses to Christian activity are documented in reports (through Christian eyes) of the response of the priestly authorities in the Book of Acts, through mentions of Jesus in the Talmud, then they are documented in rabbinical texts, such as those which are cited by Steven T. Katz in The Rabbinic Response to Christianity (2006).

During the Middle Ages, rabbinical scholars combated missionary activities with works such as Ibn Shaprut's Touchstone. In modern times, in response to the activities of organizations such as Moishe Rosen's Jews for Jesus, Jews for Judaism and other organizations were founded.

References

External links 
  The Cambridge History of Judaism Vol. 4: The Late Roman-Rabbinic Period - Ch.11  The rabbinic response to Christianity by Steven T. Katz 
 The Online Jewish Missions History Project Collection contains 90 documents from 1807–1922
 Lausanne Consultation on Jewish Evangelism: Conference Papers, since 1981, sorted by Author

Christian missions
Conversion of Jews to Christianity